is a Japanese manga series written and illustrated by Michiteru Kusaba. It was serialized in Shogakukan's Weekly Shōnen Sunday from July 1999 to March 2004. Its chapters were collected and published in twenty-five tankōbon volumes. A sequel manga, was serialized in Weekly Shōnen Sunday from October 2012 to August 2015, which was collected into fourteen tankōbon volumes. A 3-episode anime OVA, produced by Xebec, was broadcast on Tokyo MX from December 8 to December 22, 2015. The episodes were released on DVD with volumes 8, 9, and 10 of the manga from September 2014 to February 2015.

Story 
The story follows Teppei Sakamoto, a country boy, who is a lover of soccer. His sister teaches him all about the game, then suggests he join the Mizumoto High School Soccer team to follow his dreams.

Characters

Media

Manga 
Fantasista is written and illustrated by Michiteru Kusaba. The series started in issue #35 of Shogakukan's Weekly Shōnen Sunday, where it ran from July 28, 1999 to March 3, 2004. The series was collected into twenty-five tankōbon volumes published by Shogakukan, released from January 18, 2000 to May 18, 2004 (which were reprinted from June 18, 2014 to May 18, 2015), and thirteen bunkoban volumes from November 15, 2008 to October 15, 2009. The sequel, Fantasista Stella, started in issue #45 of Weekly Shōnen Sunday, where it ran from October 10, 2012 to August 19, 2015. The series was collected into fourteen tankōbon volumes, released from January 18, 2013 to November 18, 2015.

Volume list

Fantasista

Fantasista Stella

Original video animation 
The episodes were released on DVD along with volumes 8, 9, and 10 of the manga from September 18, 2014 to February 18, 2015.

Episode list

See also 
Daiku no Hatō — Another manga series by the same author.

References

External links 
Official anime OVA website 
 

Association football in anime and manga
Shōnen manga
Shogakukan manga
Xebec (studio)